Kanakubo is a Japanese surname. Notable people with the surname include:

, Japanese footballer
, Japanese footballer

Fictional characters
, a character in the visual novel Starry Sky

Japanese-language surnames